is an underground city located in central Hiroshima.
It is the key underground network connecting public transport services around the Kamiyachō area.
It contains two stations of the Astram Line and three stations of the Hiroden Main Line and the Ujina Line.
This underground network is the only way to connect to those five stations.
At the center of Kamiyachō Shareo, there is a transportation and tourist information center.

Location
Kamiyachō Shareo is located underground around the Kamiyachō intersection between Rijō-dōri (avenue) and Aioi-dōri (street).
Astram Line's train runs under Kamiyachō Shareo, around Rijō-dōri and across Aioi-dōri.
The Hiroden Main Line and Ujina Line's streetcar run at street level on  Aioi-dōri and Rijō-dōri.

History
Kamiyachō Shareo was opened in 2001 as a public underground network with a shopping area by the Hiroshima City and the  Hiroshima Prefecture governments.
The area is operated by Hiroshima Chikagaikaihatsu which was established by city, prefecture, financial institutions and private enterprises.
On the corner of the Kamiyachō intersection, there was a traffic control tower.
And around the intersection, there were pedestrian crossings on the streets.

Main areas
"Shareo Central Place"—under the intersection of Rijō-dōri (street) and Aioi-dōri
"Shareo i Center"—Information center at Shareo Central Place
Information about transportation, tourism, weather, shopping and events around Hiroshima.
Open hours: 11:00–21:00
Information display operating hours: 7:00–22:30
"Shareo North Street"—under Rijo-street
"Entrance of Astram Kencho-mae Station"
"Exit to Hiroshima Prefectural Offices"
"Exit to Hiroshima Bus Center, Sogo and AQ'A Hiroshima Center City"
"Exit to Motomachi Cred
"Exit to bus stops"
"Connecting to the underground passage to Hiroshima Green Arena, Hiroshima Chuo Park, Hiroshima Castle and Hiroshima Municipal Hospital"
"Cafe and Shops"
"Shareo South Street"—under Rijo-street
"Entrance of Astram Hondori Station"
"Entrance of Hiroden Hondori Station"
"Exit to bus stops"
"Exit to Hondori"
"Cafe and Shops"
"Shareo East Street"—under Aioi-street
"Entrance of Hiroden Kamiya-cho-higashi Station"
"Exit to bus stops"
"Cafe, Restaurants and Shops"
"Shareo West Street"—under Aioi-street
"Entrance of Hiroden Kamiya-cho-nishi Station"
"Exit to Hiroshima Peace Memorial"
"Exit to Hiroshima Municipal Stadium"
"Exit to bus stops"
"Cafe, Restaurants and Shops"

Facilities
Information center
Entrance of two Astram Line's stations
Entrance of three Hiroden Main Line and Ujina Line's stations
Shops
Restaurants and cafes
Police office
Parking
ATMs
Coin-operated locker system

Access
Astram Line at Kencho-mae Station and Hondori Station
Hiroden Main Line at Kamiya-cho-higashi and Kamiya-cho-nishi
Hiroden Ujina Line at Hondori
Hiroshima Bus Center

Operator company

 is a Japanese urban planning and facility management company based in Hiroshima, Japan.
The company operates Kamiyachō Shareo.

History
Founded on December 17, 1990.
Renewed as Voluntary sector on May 1, 1992
Opened Kamiyachō Shareo on April 11, 2001

See also

Hiroshima Green Arena
Hiroshima Castle
Motomachi Cred
Hiroshima Bus Center
Sogo
Hiroshima Peace Memorial
Hiroshima Municipal Stadium
Hiroshima Chikagaikaihatsu

External links
Kamiya-cho Shareo

Underground cities
Buildings and structures in Hiroshima